Truth to Power may refer to:

 "Truth to Power" (song), a song by OneRepublic
 An Inconvenient Sequel: Truth to Power, a 2017 film documentary
 Speaking truth to power, a non-violent political tactic
 Speak Truth to Power: A Quaker Search for an Alternative to Violence a 1955 American Friends Service Committee pamphlet
 Speak Truth To Power: Human Rights Defenders Who Are Changing Our World (2003), a book by Kerry Kennedy